The Resistance Medal was a decoration bestowed by the French Committee of National Liberation, based in the United Kingdom, during World War II. It was established by a decree of General Charles de Gaulle on 9 February 1943 "to recognize the remarkable acts of faith and of courage that, in France, in the empire and abroad, have contributed to the resistance of the French people against the enemy and against its accomplices since 18 June 1940".

The Resistance medal was awarded to approximately 38,288 living persons and 24,463 posthumously. These awards were both for membership in the Free French forces and for participation in the metropolitan clandestine Resistance during the German occupation of France in World War II. Higher deeds were rewarded with the Ordre de la Libération. Proposals for the medal ceased to be accepted on 31 March 1947. For acts that occurred in Indochina, however, that date was moved back to 31 December 1947.

The medal was also awarded to 18 communities and territories, 21 military units, and to 15 other organizations including convents, high schools, and hospitals that particularly distinguished themselves.

Award statute

 

The Resistance medal is awarded by the Chief of a Fighting France to French individuals and communities:
 who took an especially active part since 18 June 1940 in the resistance against Axis forces and their accomplices on French soil or in a  territory under French sovereignty;
 who took an effective and important part in the rallying of French territories to Fighting France or rendered services in the war effort of those territories that were confirmed and logged;
 who played an eminent role in the actions of organizations of Fighting France abroad or in propaganda destined at regrouping and supporting the forces of the resistance;
 who rallied troops, ships or aircraft in exceptionally difficult or dangerous conditions; 
 who joined the Free French Forces in particularly dangerous and meritorious conditions.

The Resistance medal may be revoked by decree following any act contrary to honour or integrity, whether committed prior to or after bestowal of the medal.

Award description
The Resistance medal is a 37mm in diameter circular medal struck from bronze.  Its slightly concave obverse bears at center a vertical Cross of Lorraine with the relief semi circular inscription of the date of General de Gaulle's appeal of 18 June 1940 in Roman numerals "XVIII.VI.MCMXL" (18.06.1940) bisected by the lower part of the cross.  The reverse bears the relief image of an unfurling ribbon bearing the relief inscription in Latin "PATRIA NON IMMEMOR" translating into "THE NATION DOES NOT FORGET".  The suspension is cast as an integral part of the medal.

The medal hangs from a 36mm wide black silk moiré ribbon with six vertical red stripes of varying widths, 3mm wide edge stripes, two 1mm wide central stripes 2mm apart, and two 1mm wide stripes 6mm from the central stripes.  A 28mm in diameter rosette is on the ribbon of the Officer of the Resistance medal.

Notable recipients (partial list)
Resistance leader Jean Pierre-Bloch
Resistance member Josephine Baker
Resistance leader and air force pilot Claudius Billon
Resistance member Albert Haar
Resistance member Andrzej Kuśniewicz
Resistance member Georges Caussanel
Resistance member Jane Vialle
Resistance member lieutenant Henry Andraud
Resistance member Marcel Dufriche
Resistance member Édouard Le Jeune, former Senator 
Resistance leader Colonel Émile Coulaudon
Resistance leader Capitaine Adrien Pommier
SOE Operative and First Aid Nursing Yeomanry member Nancy Wake
Admiral Philippe Auboyneau
Resistance movement founder, army lieutenant, businessman and politician Antoine Avinin
Lieutenant General Marcel Bigeard
Foreign Legion general Bernard Saint-Hillier
Foreign Legion Lieutenant Colonel Pierre Jeanpierre
French paratrooper André Zirnheld (The Paratrooper's Prayer)
Writer, statesman, resistance member André Malraux
Resistance member, union leader, SOE operative and politician Yvon Morandat
Writer, statesman, resistance member Paul Rassinier
Irish playwright, director, novelist Samuel Beckett
Irish language teacher and resistance worker Janie McCarthy
Resistance leader Pierre Kahn-Farelle
Politician, resistance member general Pierre de Bénouville
Resistance member doctor Charles Cliquet
Resistance member Jeanne L'Herminier
Resistance member sous-liutenant Marina Vega (Base Espagne)
Free French soldier general François Binoche
Resistance Leader Camille Nicolas
Free French Forces and Office of Strategic Services Captain René Joyeuse 
Diplomat Louis Alexis Étienne Bonvin
Resistance member Émile Bollaert
Resistance leader Edmond Proust
Free French soldier warrant officer Walter Grand
Resistance leader Joseph Dubar
Free French navy admiral Georges Thierry d'Argenlieu
Resistance member, captain in the French military, French art historian and "Monuments Men" member Rose Valland
Resistance leader and general practitioner, André Vansteenberghe
Resistance member, general practitioner, torture victim of and prosecution witness against Klaus Barbie, Alice Vansteenberghe
Resistance proeminent organiser in Marseille, Jacques Baumel

Notable posthumous recipients (partial list)
Grenoble resistance member Jean Pain
Free French aviator lieutenant Gérard Claron
Free French aviator captain Louis Flury-Hérard
Resistance leader general Aubert Frère
Captain, doctor, mayor of Saint-Rambert-en-Bugey, Michel Temporal
Resistance member Pierre Guillou
Free French aviator Pierre Brisdoux Galloni d'Istria
Resistance leader Fernand Zalkinow
Resistance member colonel Émile Bonotaux
Resistance member brigadier general Georges Journois
Abbot René Bonpain
Resistance leader Pierre Brossolette
Resistance leader Pierre Kaan
Resistance member Léger Fouris
Resistance member Gabriel Plançon
Resistance member rabbi Samuel Klein
Resistance member Laurent Matheron
Resistance leader Marc Haguenau
Resistance member Georges Lamarque
Resistance leader rear admiral Jacques Trolley de Prévaux
Resistance member Jean Chaffanjon
Resistance member Pierre Chaffanjon
Resistance member Yvonne Chollet
Resistance member Robert Duterque
Resistance member Henri Fertet (1926-1943)
Resistance member, chemist France Bloch-Sérazin (1913 – 1943)
Resistance member Agnès de La Barre de Nanteuil (1922–1944)

Recipient communities and organizations (partial list)
Oyonnax commune
University of Strasbourg
Montceau-les-Mines commune
Lalande de Bourg-en-Bresse high school
6th Engineers Regiment
Preparatory Military School of Autun
Marsoulas commune
Caniac-du-Causse commune
Miribel commune
Béthincourt commune
Meximieux commune
1st Line Infantry Regiment
Terrou commune
Nantua commune
Notre-Dame de Timadeuc abbey

13th Demi-Brigade of the Foreign Legion
1st Marines Regiment
City of Brest
Caen commune

See also

Free French Forces
French Resistance
Milice
Liberation of France
Maquis

References

External links
 La Commission nationale de la Médaille de la Résistance 

Civil awards and decorations of France
French campaign medals
French Resistance
Awards established in 1943
Military awards and decorations of World War II